In directional statistics, the von Mises–Fisher distribution (named after Richard von Mises and Ronald Fisher), is a probability distribution on the -sphere in . If 
the distribution reduces to the von Mises distribution on the circle.

Definition
The probability density function of the von Mises–Fisher distribution for the random p-dimensional unit vector  is given by:

where  and  
the normalization constant  is equal to

 

where  denotes the modified Bessel function of the first kind at order . If , the normalization constant reduces to
 

It was first used to model the interaction of electric dipoles in an electric field. Other applications are found in geology, bioinformatics, and text mining.

Note on the normalization constant
In the textbook by Mardia and Jupp, the normalization constant given for the Von Mises Fisher probability density is apparently different from the one given here: . In that book, the normalization constant is specified as:
 
This is resolved by noting that Mardia and Jupp give the density "with respect to the uniform distribution", while the density here is specified in the usual way, with respect to Lebesgue measure. The density (w.r.t. Lebesgue measure) of the uniform distribution is the reciprocal of the surface area of the (p-1)-sphere, so that the uniform density function is given by the constant:

It then follows that:
 
(To evaluate that term, one needs to use the definition .)

Relation to normal distribution 

Starting from a normal distribution with isotropic covariance  and mean  of length , whose density function is: 

By expanding

and using the fact that the first two right-hand-side terms are fixed, the Von Mises-Fisher density,  is recovered by recomputing the normalization constant by integrating  over the unit sphere. If , we get the uniform distribution, with density .

More succinctly, the restriction of any isotropic multivariate normal density to the unit hypersphere, gives a Von Mises-Fisher density, up to normalization.

This construction can be generalized by starting with a normal distribution with a general covariance matrix, in which case conditioning on  gives the Fisher-Bingham distribution.

Estimation of parameters

Mean direction
A series of N independent unit vectors  are drawn from a von Mises–Fisher distribution. 
The maximum likelihood estimates of the mean direction  is simply the normalized arithmetic mean, a sufficient statistic:

Concentration parameter
Use the modified Bessel function of the first kind to define

 

Then:

Thus  is the solution to

A more accurate inversion can be obtained by iterating the Newton method a few times

Standard error
For N ≥ 25, the estimated spherical standard error of the sample mean direction can be computed as: 

where

 where 
For example, for a 95% confidence cone,  and thus

Expected value
The expected value of the Von Mises–Fisher distribution is not on the unit hypersphere, but instead has a length of less than one. For a Von Mises–Fisher distribution with mean direction  and concentration , the expected value is: 
. 
For , the expected value is at the origin.

The empirical mean (arithmetic average) of a collection of points on the unit hypersphere behaves in a similar manner, being close to the origin for widely  spread data and close to the sphere for concentrated data. Indeed, for the Von Mises–Fisher distribution, the expected value of the maximum-likelihood estimate based on a collection of points is equal to the empirical mean of those points.

Entropy and KL divergence 
The expected value can be used to compute differential entropy and KL divergence.

 . 
Notice that the entropy is a function of  only.

Transformation
Von Mises-Fisher (VMF) distributions are closed under orthogonal linear transforms. Let  be a -by- orthogonal matrix. Let  and apply the invertible linear transform: . Using these facts and the form of the VMF density, it follows that:  

Pseudo-random number generation 

where  is the polar angle,  the equatorial angle, and  the distance to the center of the sphere

for  the pseudo-random vector is then given by

where  is sampled from the continuous uniform distribution  with lower bound  and upper bound 

and

where  is sampled from the standard continuous uniform distribution 

here, should be set to  when  and  rotated to match any other desired

Generalizations

The matrix von Mises-Fisher distribution (also known as matrix Langevin distribution) has the density

supported on the Stiefel manifold of  orthonormal p-frames , where  is an arbitrary  real matrix.

Distribution of polar angle

It has the distribution
,
which can be easily evaluated as
.

See also
 Kent distribution, a related distribution on the two-dimensional unit sphere
 von Mises distribution, von Mises–Fisher distribution where p = 2, the one-dimensional unit circle
 Bivariate von Mises distribution
 Directional statistics

References

Further reading
 Dhillon, I., Sra, S. (2003) "Modeling Data using Directional Distributions". Tech. rep., University of Texas, Austin.
 Banerjee, A., Dhillon, I. S., Ghosh, J., & Sra, S. (2005). "Clustering on the unit hypersphere using von Mises-Fisher distributions". Journal of Machine Learning Research, 6(Sep), 1345-1382.
 

Directional statistics
Multivariate continuous distributions
Exponential family distributions
Continuous distributions